Karamsar is a village in Faisalabad, Pakistan.

References

Villages in Faisalabad District